Mary Barnes may refer to:

 Mary Barnes Cabell (1815–1900), American freedwoman
 Mary Sheldon Barnes (1850–1898), American educator and historian
 Mary Barnes (artist) (1923–2001), English artist and writer